Mark Hollo is a former Republican member of the North Carolina House of Representatives who represented the state's 73rd district (including all of Alexander and Yadkin counties as well as part of Wilkes County) district from 2013 until 2015. Prior to redistricting, Hollo represented the 88th district (including all of Alexander County and part of Catawba County) from 2011 until 2013 and also from 2005 until 2007. Hollo was candidate for the 42nd district of the North Carolina Senate (which includes all of Alexander and Catawba Counties) in both 2018 and 2020, losing the Republican nomination to Andy Wells and Dean Proctor, respectively.

Career
Ahead of the 2004 elections, the North Carolina General Assembly drew new districts to be used for elections  to itself for the elections up until 2012. The legislature created a new 88th district that included all of Alexander County and part of Catawba County which had no incumbent. Hollo was elected to the seat in 2004, defeating Democratic nominee Joel Harbinson. In 2006 he ran for re-election, but he was defeated by Ray Warren, a former Alexander County Sheriff who had unsuccessfully run for the NC House in 2002. Hollo lost again in a rematch in 2008, but easily gained back his former seat in 2010 when Warren didn't seek re-election. In 2012, legislative redistricting renumbered his district as the 73rd and it traded its Catawba County portion for all of Yadkin County and a small portion of southeast Wilkes County. Hollo faced another incumbent, Darrell McCormick in the 2012 primary, but easily defeated him and won the general election in a landslide against Democratic nominee William Stinson. Hollo didn't seek re-election in 2014. Hollo unsuccessfully ran for the North Carolina Senate in the 42nd district in both 2018 and 2020, losing the Republican nomination both times. In both elections, Hollo had a strong lead amongst Alexander County voters but lost to his opponents Wells and Proctor in the more populous Catawba County portion of the district.

Committee assignments

2013-2014 session
Appropriations (Vice Chair)
Health and Human Services (Chair)
Homeland Security, Military, and Veterans Affairs
Public Utilities
State Personnel

2011-2012 session
Appropriations
Health and Human Services - Chair
Homeland Security, Military, and Veterans Affairs
Public Utilities

Electoral history

2020

2018

2012

2010

2008

2006

2004

References

|-

|-

Living people
1958 births
People from Litchfield, Illinois
People from Conover, North Carolina
Southern Illinois University alumni
Republican Party members of the North Carolina House of Representatives
21st-century American politicians